The Estádio Edgar Borges Montenegro, nicknamed Edgarzão, is a football stadium located in the city of Assu, in the state of Rio Grande do Norte, it belongs to the Liga Assuense de Desportos and has a maximum capacity of 4,000 people. It is the home stadium of Associação Sportiva Sociedade Unida.

References

Sports venues in Rio Grande do Norte
Football venues in Rio Grande do Norte